Soroku Murata (Japanese 無量塔 蔵六; real name Shōichirō Murata, Japanese 村田 昭一郎; * March 4, 1927 in Tokyo, † January 30, 2020 ibidem) was the first Japanese violinmaker with a German master craftsman’s diploma.

Life 
Soroku Murata was born on March 4, 1927, in Oi-machi, Ebara-gun in Tokyo. He graduated from Dokkyō Junior High School in the 55th class.

To avoid being drafted during World War II, he joined his uncle as a factory worker. On the job, he showed his talent for manual craftsmanship and was therefore assigned to metal casting. After the war ended, he became a member of the Kyoto Opera Company Orchestra in 1947, the Shimbashi Florida Dance Hall in 1949, and of the Hospital Orchestra at the American Army Officers' Club. However, due to the professional musicians returning from the war service, he lost his employments.

In 1951 he became self-taught in violin making as well as repair. He learned the professional use of tools from Mitsugu Ōta, a woodworker at the time who later specialized in crafting piano soundboards.

In 1955, he joined Noboru Nagasako's study group at the Tokyo Institute of Technology to study acoustics for violin making. In 1962, with the support of Nagasako and Alfred Leicht, a violin maker from Berlin as guarantor, he enrolled in the Staatliche Musikinstrumentenbauschule Mittenwald, Bavaria. As the first Japanese, Murata passed the master craftsman violin making examination in 1963, and subsequently returned to Japan in 1964.

In 1956, he became a board member of the Japan String Instrument Manufacturers Association.

Murata became a member of the German Violinmakers Association (VdG) in 1968, the first Japanese to do so.

In 1974, he was commissioned by the Japan Gagaku Society to restore a Kugo harp, which was used at the Society's 13th public concert at the National Theater on December 17 the same year. The harp’s sound had not been heard for 1200 years.

In 1976, he won the gold medal in the Violin Society of America's violin making competition on the occasion of the USA’s Bicentennial of Independence.

On April 2nd 1979, Murata opened the Tokyo Violin Making School in his private home, to train his successors.

In 1986, he was the first person from Asia to become a member of the Entente International des Luthiers et Architiers (EILA, engl.  International Society of Violin and Bow Makers Entente Internationale des Maitres Luthiers et Archetiers d'Art (EILA) ).

He was a regular jury member of the Prague International Violin Making Competition (1986-1993), the International Henryk Wieniawski Violin Making Competition (1986-2001), the International Tchaikovsky Competition (1986-2002), the Sofia International String Competition (1987-1996), and a jury member of the Long-Thibaud-Crespin Competition in 1990.

In July 1998, he became an honorary member of the Japan String Instrument Makers’ Association.

In March 2007, at the age of 80, he closed the violin making school in Tokyo.

On January 30, 2020, he died from cancer at the age of 92. The funeral service was held on February 6 the same year.

Trivia 
 The inspiration for his pseudonym Soroku Murata (無量塔 蔵六) comes from his great-grandfather, who was a follower of Soroku Murata (Japanese 村田蔵六, real name Masujirō Ōmura; Japanese 大村益次郎).
 Murata had a passion for motorcycles.
 Students of Murata’s violin making school received the status of German journeyman craftsmen upon successful completion of their studies, and could also qualify for the master craftsman's examination (Meisterprüfung) by working under a German master craftsman for the duration of three years.

Publications

Books

Articles

Sources

Further information 
 Murata Soroku Vaiorin wo kataru [Soroku Murata. A Talk about Violins] 
 Obituary on Soroku Murata

1927 births
2020 deaths
Japanese luthiers
Japanese musical instrument makers
People from Tokyo